The Moneasa is a river in Bihor County and Arad County, Romania. At its confluence with the river Dezna in the village Dezna, the river Sebiș is formed.

References

Rivers of Romania
Rivers of Arad County